This is a list of schools in Essex, England. Essex is the second largest Local Education Authority in England.

State-funded schools

Primary schools

Abacus Primary School, Wickford
Abbotsweld Primary Academy, Harlow
Acorn Academy, Witham
The Alderton Infant School, Loughton
The Alderton Junior School, Loughton
All Saints' CE Primary School, Dovercourt 
All Saints' CE Primary School, Great Oakley
All Saints' Maldon CE Primary School, Maldon 
Alresford Primary School, Alresford
Alton Park Junior School, Clacton-on-Sea
Ashdon Primary School, Ashdon
Ashingdon Primary Academy, Ashingdon
Baddow Hall Infant School, Great Baddow
Baddow Hall Junior School , Great Baddow
Bardfield Academy, Vange
Barling Magna Primary Academy, Barling Magna
Barnes Farm Infant School, Chelmsford
Barnes Farm Junior School, Chelmsford
Baynards Primary School, Tiptree
The Beaulieu Park School, Chelmsford
Beckers Green Primary School, Braintree	
Beehive Lane Community Primary School, Great Baddow
Belchamp St Paul CE Primary School, Belchamp St Paul
Bentfield Primary School, Stansted Mountfitchet	
Bentley St Paul's CE Primary School, Bentley
Birch CE Primary School, Birch
Birchanger CE Primary School, Birchanger
The Bishop William Ward CE Primary School, Great Horkesley
The Bishops' CE and RC Primary School, Chelmsford
Blackmore Primary School, Blackmore
Bocking Primary School, Bocking
Boreham Primary School, Boreham
Boxted St Peter's CE School, Boxted
Bradfield Primary School, Bradfield
Braiswick Primary School, Braiswick
Brightlingsea Primary School, Brightlingsea
Brightside Primary School, Billericay
Brinkley Grove Primary School, Colchester
Briscoe Primary School, Pitsea		
Broomfield Primary School, Broomfield
Broomgrove Infant School, Wivenhoe
Broomgrove Junior School, Wivenhoe
Buckhurst Hill Community Primary School, Buckhurst Hill
Burnham-on-Crouch Primary School, Burnham-on-Crouch
Burrsville Infant Academy, Clacton-on-Sea
Buttsbury Infant School, Billericay	
Buttsbury Junior School, Billericay
Camulos Academy, Colchester
Canewdon Endowed CE Primary School, Canewdon
Cann Hall Primary School, Clacton-on-Sea
Canvey Island Infant School, Canvey Island
Canvey Junior School, Canvey Island
The Cathedral CE Primary School, Chelmsford
Chancellor Park Primary School, Chelmsford
Chappel CE Primary School, Chappel
Chase Lane Primary School, Dovercourt
Cherry Tree Academy, Colchester
Cherry Tree Primary School, Basildon	
Chigwell Primary Academy, Chigwell
Chigwell Row Infant School, Chigwell
Chipping Hill Primary School, Witham
Chipping Ongar Primary School, Chipping Ongar
Chrishall Holy Trinity and St Nicholas CE Primary School, Chrishall
Church Langley Community Primary School, Harlow
Churchgate CE Primary School, Harlow
Clavering Primary School, Clavering
Cold Norton Primary School, Cold Norton
Collingwood Primary School, South Woodham Ferrers
Colne Engaine CE Primary School, Colne Engaine
Cooks Spinney Primary Academy, Harlow
Coopersale and Theydon Garnon CE Primary School, Coopersale
Copford CE Primary School, Copford
Crays Hill Primary School, Crays Hill
Cressing Primary School, Tye Green
Danbury Park Community Primary School, Danbury
de Vere Primary School, Castle Hedingham
Debden CE Primary Academy, Debden
Dedham CE Primary School, Dedham
Doddinghurst CE Junior School, Doddinghurst
Doddinghurst Infant School, Doddinghurst
Down Hall Primary School, Rayleigh
Downham CE Primary School, Downham
The Downs Primary School, Harlow
Dr Walker's CE Primary School, Fyfield
Dunmow St Mary's Primary School, Great Dunmow
Earls Colne Primary School, Earls Colne	
East Hanningfield CE Primary School, East Hanningfield	
Edward Francis Primary School, Rayleigh
Elm Hall Primary School, Witham
Elmstead Primary School, Elmstead Market
Elmwood Primary School, South Woodham Ferrers
Elsenham CE Primary School, Elsenham 
Engaines Primary School, Little Clacton
Epping Primary School, Epping		
Epping Upland CE Primary School, Epping Green
Eversley Primary School, Pitsea
Fairhouse Community Primary School, Basildon	
Farnham CE Primary School, Farnham
Fawbert and Barnard's Primary School, Old Harlow
Feering CE Primary School, Feering
Felmore Primary School, Pitsea
Felsted Primary School, Felsted
Finchingfield St John the Baptist CE Primary Academy, Finchingfield
Fingringhoe CE Primary School, Fingringhoe
The Flitch Green Academy, Little Dunmow	
Ford End CE Primary School, Ford End
Fordham All Saints CE Primary School, Fordham
Freshwaters Primary Academy, Harlow
Friars Grove Primary School, Colchester
Frinton-on-Sea Primary School, Frinton-on-Sea
Galleywood Infant School, Galleywood
Ghyllgrove Primary School, Basildon
Glebe Primary School, Rayleigh
Gosbecks Primary School, Colchester
Gosfield Community Primary School, Gosfield
Grange Primary School, Wickford
Great Bardfield Primary School, Great Bardfield	
Great Bentley Primary School, Great Bentley
Great Berry Primary School, Langdon Hills
Great Bradfords Infant School, Braintree
Great Bradfords Junior School, Braintree
Great Chesterford CE Primary Academy, Great Chesterford
Great Clacton CE Junior School, Great Clacton
Great Dunmow Primary School, Great Dunmow
Great Easton CE Primary School, Great Easton
Great Leighs Primary School, Great Leighs
Great Sampford Community Primary School, Great Sampford
Great Tey CE Primary School, Great Tey
Great Totham Primary School, Great Totham	
Great Wakering Primary Academy, Great Wakering
Great Waltham CE Primary School, Great Waltham
Greensted Infant School, Basildon
Greensted Junior School, Basildon
Grove Wood Primary School, Rayleigh
Hadleigh Infant School, Hadleigh
Hadleigh Junior School, Hadleigh	
Hamford Primary Academy, Walton-on-the-Naze
Hamilton Primary School, Colchester
Hare Street Community Primary School, Harlow
Harlowbury Primary School, Old Harlow
Harwich Community Primary School, Harwich
Hatfield Heath Primary School , Hatfield Heath
Hatfield Peverel Infant School, Hatfield Peverel
Hatfield Peverel St Andrew's Junior School, Hatfield Peverel
Hazelmere Infant School, Colchester
Hazelmere Junior School, Colchester
Heathlands CE Primary School, West Bergholt
Helena Romanes School, Great Dunmow
Henham and Ugley Primary School, Henham
Henry Moore Primary School, Church Langley
Hereward Primary School, Loughton
Heybridge Primary School, Heybridge
High Beech CE Primary School, High Beach 	
High Ongar Primary School, High Ongar
Highfields Primary School, Lawford
Highwood Primary School, Highwood
Highwoods Community Primary School, Colchester
Hillhouse CE Primary School, Waltham Abbey
Hilltop Infant School, Wickford
Hilltop Junior School, Wickford
Hockley Primary School, Hockley
Hogarth Primary School, Brentwood
Holland Haven Primary School, Holland-on-Sea
Holland Park Primary School, Clacton-on-Sea
Holly Trees Primary School, Warley
Holt Farm Infant School, Rochford
Holt Farm Junior School, Rochford
Holy Cross RC Primary School, Harlow
Holy Family RC Primary School, South Benfleet
Holy Family RC Primary School, Witham 	
Holy Trinity CE Primary School, Fordham Heath
Holy Trinity CE Primary School, Halstead
Home Farm Primary School, Colchester
Howbridge CE Junior School, Witham
Howbridge Infant School, Witham
Hutton All Saints' CE Primary School, Brentwood
Iceni Academy, Colchester
Ingatestone and Fryerning CE Junior School, Ingatestone
Ingatestone Infant School, Ingatestone
Ingrave Johnstone CE Primary School, Ingrave 	
Ivy Chimneys Primary School, Epping
Janet Duke Primary School, Laindon
Jerounds Primary Academy, Harlow	
John Bunyan Primary School, Braintree
John Ray Infant School, Braintree
John Ray Junior School, Braintree
Jotmans Hall Primary School, Benfleet
Katherine Semar Infant School, Saffron Walden
Katherine Semar Junior School , Saffron Walden
Katherines Primary Academy, Harlow
Kelvedon Hatch Community Primary School, Kelvedon Hatch
Kelvedon St Mary's CE Primary Academy, Kelvedon
Kendall CE Primary School, Colchester
Kents Hill Infant Academy, Benfleet
Kents Hill Junior School, Benfleet
King's Ford Infant School, Colchester
Kings Road Primary School, Chelmsford
Kingsmoor Academy, Harlow
Kingston Primary School, Thundersley
Kingswood Primary School, Basildon
Kirby Primary Academy, Kirby Cross
Laindon Park Primary School, Laindon
Lakelands Primary School, Colchester
Lambourne Primary School, Abridge
Langenhoe Community Primary School, Abberton
Langham Primary School, Langham	
Larchwood Primary School, Brentwood
Larkrise Primary School, Great Baddow
Latchingdon CE Primary School, Latchingdon
Latton Green Primary Academy, Harlow
Lawford CE Primary School, Lawford
Lawford Mead Primary, Chelmsford
Layer-de-la-Haye CE Primary School, Layer de la Haye
Lee Chapel Primary School, Basildon
Leigh Beck Infant School, Canvey Island
Leigh Beck Junior School, Canvey Island	
Leverton Primary School, Waltham Abbey
Lexden Primary School, Colchester
Limes Farm Infant School, Chigwell
Limes Farm Junior School, Chigwell
Lincewood Primary School, Langdon Hills
Little Hallingbury CE Primary School, Little Hallingbury
Little Parndon Primary Academy, Harlow
Little Waltham CE Primary School, Little Waltham
Long Ridings Primary School, Hutton
Longwood Primary Academy, Harlow
Lubbins Park Primary Academy, Canvey Island
Lyons Hall School, Braintree
Magna Carta Primary Academy, Stansted Mountfitchet
Maldon Primary School, Maldon
Maltese Road Primary School, Chelmsford
Manuden Primary School, Manuden
Maple Grove Primary School, Pitsea
Margaretting CE Primary School, Margaretting
Matching Green CE Primary School, Matching Green	
The Mayflower Primary School, Dovercourt
Maylandsea Primary School, Maylandsea
Meadgate Primary School, Great Baddow
Merrylands Primary School, Laindon
Mersea Island School, West Mersea	
Messing Primary School, Messing
Mildmay Primary School, Chelmsford
Milldene Primary School, Tiptree
Millfields Primary School, Wivenhoe
Millhouse Primary School, Laindon	
Milwards Primary School, Harlow	
Mistley Norman CE Primary School, Mistley
Monkwick Infant School, Colchester
Monkwick Junior School, Colchester	
Montgomerie Primary School, Thundersley
Montgomery Infant School, Colchester
Montgomery Junior School, Colchester 	
Moreton CE Primary School, Moreton
Moulsham Infant School, Chelmsford
Moulsham Junior School, Chelmsford	
Mountnessing CE Primary School, Mountnessing	
Myland Community Primary School, Myland
Nazeing Primary School, Nazeing
Newhall Primary Academy, Harlow
Newlands Spring Primary School, Chelmsford
Newport Primary School, Newport
Noak Bridge Primary School, Basildon	
North Crescent Primary School, Wickford
North Primary School, Colchester	
Northlands Primary School, Pitsea
Northwick Park Primary Academy, Canvey Island
Notley Green Primary School, Great Notley
Oakfield Primary School, Wickford
Oaklands Infant School, Chelmsford
Oakwood Infant School, Clacton-on-Sea
Old Heath Community Primary School, Colchester
Ongar Primary School, Shelley
Our Lady Immaculate RC Primary School, Chelmsford	
Our Lady of Ransom RC Primary School, Rayleigh
Parkwood Academy, Chelmsford
Parsons Heath CE Primary School, Colchester 	
Pear Tree Mead Academy, Harlow
Pemberley Academy, Harlow
Perryfields Infant School, Chelmsford
Perryfields Junior School, Chelmsford
The Phoenix Primary School, Laindon	 
Plumberow Primary Academy, Hockley
Potter Street Academy, Harlow
Powers Hall Academy, Witham
Prettygate Infant School, Colchester
Prettygate Junior School, Colchester
Priory Primary School, Bicknacre
Purford Green Primary School, Harlow
Purleigh Community Primary School, Purleigh
Queen Boudica Primary School, Colchester
Quilters Infant School, Billericay
Quilters Junior School, Billericay
R A Butler Infant School, Saffron Walden
R A Butler Junior School, Saffron Walden
Radwinter CE Primary School, Radwinter
Ravens Academy, Clacton-on-Sea
Rayleigh Primary School, Rayleigh
Rayne Primary School, Rayne
Rettendon Primary School, Rettendon 	
Richard De Clare Community Academy, Halstead
Rickling CE Primary School, Rickling
Ridgewell CE Primary School, Ridgewell
Rivenhall CE Primary School, Rivenhall
Riverside Primary School, Hullbridge	
Roach Vale Primary School, Colchester
The Robert Drake Primary School, Thundersley
Rochford Primary School, Rochford
Rodings Primary School, Leaden Roding
Rolph CE Primary School, Thorpe-le-Soken
Roseacres Primary School, Takeley
Roxwell CE Primary School, Roxwell	
Roydon Primary School, Roydon 	
Runwell Community Primary School, Runwell	
Ryedene Primary School, Basildon
St Alban's RC Academy, Harlow
St Andrew's Bulmer CE Primary School, Bulmer
St Andrew's CE Primary School, Great Yeldham
St Andrew's CE Primary School, Halstead
St Andrew's CE Primary School, Marks Tey
St Andrew's CE Primary School, North Weald Bassett
St Anne Line RC Infant School, Basildon	
St Anne Line RC Junior School, Basildon
St Cedd's CE Primary School, Bradwell-on-Sea	
St Clare's RC Primary School, Clacton-on-Sea	
St Francis RC Primary School, Braintree 	
St Francis RC Primary School, Maldon 	
St George's CE Primary School, Great Bromley
St George's School, Colchester	
St Giles' CE Primary School, Great Maplestead
St Helen's RC Infant School, Brentwood
St Helen's RC Junior School, Brentwood
St James CE Primary School, Harlow
St James' CE Primary School, Colchester	
St John CE Primary School, Danbury	
St John Fisher RC Primary School, Loughton
St John the Baptist CE Primary School, Pebmarsh
St John's CE Primary School, Buckhurst Hill 	
St John's CE Primary School, Colchester
St John's Green Primary School, Colchester	
St Joseph the Worker RC Primary School, Hutton	
St Joseph's RC Primary School, Canvey Island 	
St Joseph's RC Primary School, Harwich 	
St Joseph's RC Primary School, South Woodham Ferrers	
St Katherine's CE Primary School, Canvey Island	
St Lawrence CE Primary School, Rowhedge
St Luke's CE Primary School, Tiptree
St Luke's Park Primary School, Runwell
St Luke's RC Academy, Harlow
St Margaret's CE Academy, Bowers Gifford
St Margaret's CE Primary School Toppesfield
St Mary's CE Primary School, Ardleigh
St Mary's CE Primary School, Burnham-on-Crouch
St Mary's CE Primary School, Hatfield Broad Oak
St Mary's CE Primary School, Saffon Walden
St Mary's CE Primary School, Stansted Mountfitchet
St Mary's CE Primary School, Woodham Ferrers
St Michael's CE Primary School, Braintree
St Michael's CE Junior School, Galleywood
St Michael's Primary School, Colchester
St Nicholas CE Primary School, Tillingham
St Nicholas' CE Primary School, Rawreth
St Osyth CE Primary School, St Osyth
St Peter's CE Primary School, Coggeshall 	
St Peter's CE Primary School, Sible Hedingham
St Peter's CE Primary School, South Weald
St Peter's CE Primary School, West Hanningfield
St Peter's RC Primary School, Billericay
St Pius X RC Primary School, Chelmsford
St Teresa's RC Primary School, Basildon
St Teresa's RC Primary School, Colchester 	
St Teresa's RC Primary School, Rochford
St Thomas More RC Primary School, Saffron Walden
St Thomas More's RC Primary School, Colchester
St Thomas of Canterbury CE Infant School, Brentwood
St Thomas of Canterbury CE Junior School, Brentwood
Shalford Primary School, Shalford
Sheering CE Primary School, Sheering
Shenfield St Mary's CE Primary School, Shenfield
Silver End Academy, Silver End
Sir Martin Frobisher Academy, Jaywick
South Benfleet Primary School, South Benfleet
South Green Infant School, Billericay
South Green Junior School, Billericay
Southminster CE Primary School, Southminster	
Spring Meadow Primary School, Dovercourt
Springfield Primary School, Springfield
Stambridge Primary School, Stambridge
Stanway Fiveways Primary School, Stanway
Stanway Primary School, Stanway
Stapleford Abbotts Primary School, Stapleford Abbotts
Staples Road Primary School, Loughton	
Stebbing Primary School, Stebbing
Steeple Bumpstead Primary School, Steeple Bumpstead
Stisted CE Primary Academy, Stisted	
Stock CE Primary School, Stock
Sunnymede Infant School, Billericay	
Sunnymede Junior School, Billericay
Takeley Primary School, Little Canfield	
Tany's Dell Primary School, Harlow
Templars Academy, Witham
Tendring Primary School, Tendring
Terling CE Primary School, Terling
Thaxted Primary School, Thaxted
Theydon Bois Primary School, Theydon Bois	
Thomas Willingale Primary School, Loughton	
Thundersley Primary School, Thundersley
Tiptree Heath Primary School, Tiptree
Tollesbury School, Tollesbury
Tolleshunt D'Arcy St Nicholas Primary Academy, Tolleshunt D'Arcy	
Trinity Road Primary School, Chelmsford	
Trinity St Mary's CE Primary School, South Woodham Ferrers
Two Village CE Primary School, Ramsey
The Tyrrells School, Springfield
Unity Primary Academy, Colchester
Upshire Primary Foundation School, Upshire
Vange Primary School, Basildon
Waltham Holy Cross Primary Academy, Waltham Abbey
Walton on the Naze Primary School, Walton-on-the-Naze	
Warley Primary School, Brentwood
Water Lane Primary Academy, Harlow
Waterman Primary Academy, Rochford
Weeley St Andrew's CE Primary School, Weeley
Wentworth Primary School, Maldon
West Horndon Primary School, West Horndon
Westerings Primary Academy, Hawkwell
Westlands Community Primary School, Chelmsford	
Westwood Academy, Hadleigh
Wethersfield CE Primary School, Wethersfield	
White Bridge Primary School, Loughton	
White Court School, Great Notley
White Hall Academy, Clacton-on-Sea
White Notley CE Primary School, White Notley
Whitmore Primary School, Basildon
The Wickford CE School, Wickford	
Wickford Primary School, Wickford
William Martin CE Infant School, Harlow
William Martin CE Junior School, Harlow	
William Read Primary School, Canvey Island	
Willow Brook Primary School, Colchester
Willowbrook Primary School, Brentwood
The Willows Primary School, Basildon	
Wimbish Primary School, Wimbish
Winter Gardens Academy, Canvey Island
Wix and Wrabness Primary School, Wix
Woodham Ley Primary School, South Benfleet
Woodham Walter CE Primary School, Woodham Walter
Woodville Primary School, South Woodham Ferrers
Writtle Infant School, Writtle
Writtle Junior School, Writtle	
Wyburns Primary School, Rayleigh

Non-selective secondary schools

 Alec Hunter Academy, Braintree
 Anglo European School, Ingatestone
 Appleton School, South Benfleet
 Basildon Academies, Basildon
 Beauchamps High School, Wickford
 The Beaulieu Park School, Chelmsford
 Becket Keys Church of England School, Brentwood
 The Billericay School, Billericay
 BMAT STEM Academy, Harlow
 The Boswells School, Chelmsford
 Brentwood County High School, Brentwood
 Brentwood Ursuline Convent High School, Brentwood
 The Bromfords School, Wickford
 Burnt Mill Academy, Harlow
 Castle View School, Canvey Island
Chelmer Valley High School, Chelmsford
 Clacton Coastal Academy, Clacton-on-Sea
 Clacton County High School, Clacton-on-Sea
 Colchester Academy, Colchester
 The Colne Community School and College, Brightlingsea
 Cornelius Vermuyden School, Canvey Island
 Davenant Foundation School, Loughton
 De La Salle School, Basildon
 The Deanes, Thundersley
 Debden Park High School, Debden
 Epping St John's School, Epping
 FitzWimarc School, Rayleigh
 Forest Hall School, Stansted Mountfitchet
 The Gilberd School, Colchester
 Great Baddow High School, Chelmsford
 Greensward Academy, Hockley
 Harwich and Dovercourt High School, Harwich
 Hedingham School, Sible Hedingham
 Helena Romanes School, Great Dunmow
 Honywood Community Science School, Coggeshall
 Hylands School, Writtle
 James Hornsby School, Laindon
 Joyce Frankland Academy, Newport
 King Edmund School, Rochford
 King Harold Business and Enterprise Academy, Waltham Abbey
 The King John School, Thundersley
 Maltings Academy, Witham
 Manningtree High School, Lawford
 Mark Hall Academy, Harlow
 Mayflower High School, Billericay
 Moulsham High School, Chelmsford
New Rickstones Academy, Witham
 Notley High School, Braintree
 The Ongar Academy, Shelley
 Ormiston Rivers Academy, Burnham-on-Crouch
 Passmores Academy, Harlow
 Paxman Academy, Colchester
 Philip Morant School and College, Colchester
 Plume School, Maldon
The Ramsey Academy, Halstead
Roding Valley High School, Loughton
 Saffron Walden County High School, Saffron Walden
 St Benedict's Catholic College, Colchester
 St Helena School, Colchester
 St John Payne Catholic School, Chelmsford
St Mark's West Essex Catholic School, Harlow
St Martin's School, Brentwood
 The Sandon School, Sandon
Shenfield High School, Shenfield
 Sir Frederick Gibberd College, Harlow
The Stanway School, Stanway
Stewards Academy, Harlow
The Sweyne Park School, Rayleigh
 Tabor Academy, Braintree
 Tendring Technology College, Frinton-on-Sea
 Thomas Lord Audley School, Colchester
 Thurstable School, Tiptree
 The Trinity School, Colchester
 West Hatch High School, Chigwell
 William de Ferrers School, South Woodham Ferrers
 Woodlands School, Basildon

Grammar schools
 Chelmsford County High School for Girls, Chelmsford
 Colchester County High School for Girls, Colchester
 Colchester Royal Grammar School, Colchester
 King Edward VI Grammar School, Chelmsford

Special and alternative schools

 Beckmead Moundwood Academy, Harlow
 Castledon School, Wickford
 Cedar Hall School, Thundersley
 Chatten Free School, Rivenhall
 Children's Support Service Langdon Hills, Langdon Hills
 Columbus School and College, Chelmsford
 The Edith Borthwick School, Braintree
 The Endeavour Co-Operative Academy, Braintree
 Glenwood School, Thundersley
 Grove House School, Brentwood
 Harlow Fields School and College, Harlow
 The Hawthorns School, Chelmsford
 Heybridge Co-Operative Academy, Heybridge
 Kingswode Hoe School, Colchester
 Langham Oaks, Langham
 Lexden Springs School, Colchester
 Market Field School, Elmstead Market
 North East Essex Co-operative Academy, Myland
 Oak View School, Loughton
 The Pioneer School, Basildon
 Poplar Adolescent Unit, Rochford
 Ramsden Hall Academy, Ramsden Heath
 The St Aubyn Centre Education Department, Colchester
 Shorefields School, Clacton-on-Sea
 Southview School, Witham
 Thriftwood School, Galleywood
 Wells Park School, Chigwell

Further education

 Braintree College
 Braintree Sixth Form
 Chelmsford College
 Colchester Institute
 Colchester Sixth Form College
 Debden House
 Epping Forest College
 Harlow College
Sixth Form College Colchester
USP College

Independent schools

Primary and preparatory schools

 Coopersale Hall School, Coopersale
 The Daiglen School, Buckhurst Hill
 Elm Green Preparatory School, Little Baddow
 Heathcote School, Danbury
 Holmwood House School, Colchester
 Howe Green House School, Howe Green
 Littlegarth School, Nayland
 Loyola Preparatory School, Buckhurst Hill
 Maldon Court Preparatory School, Maldon
 Oaklands School, Loughton
 Oxford House School, Colchester
 St Anne's School, Chelmsford
 St Cedd's School, Chelmsford
 St Margaret's Preparatory School, Gosfield
 St Philomena's School, Frinton-on-Sea
 Ursuline Preparatory School, Brentwood
 Widford Lodge Preparatory School, Chelmsford
 Woodlands School, Great Warley
 Woodlands School, Brentwood

Senior and all-through schools

 Braeside School, Buckhurst Hill
Brentwood School, Brentwood
Chigwell School, Chigwell
The Christian School, Takeley
 Colchester High School, Colchester
 Felsted School, Felsted
Gosfield School, Gosfield
Guru Gobind Singh Khalsa College, Chigwell
 New Hall School, Boreham
St John's School, Billericay
St Mary's School, Colchester
St Nicholas School, Harlow

Special and alternative schools

 The Belsteads School, Little Waltham
 Cambian Great Dunmow School, Great Dunmow
 Chelmsford Hospital School, Chelmsford
 Clarity Independent School, Sandon
 Compass Community School Essex, Little Clacton
 Doucecroft School, Eight Ash Green
 The Karalius Foundation, Rayleigh
 Luxborough Court School, Chigwell
 Octavia House Schools, Great Baddow
 Open Box Education Centre, Epping
 St John's RC School, Chigwell
 Teaseldown School, Sible Hedingham
 The Tower School, Epping
 Woodcroft School, Loughton
 The Yellow House School, Sible Hedingham

Further education
 Masters Performing Arts College

References

External links
Performance tables for Essex schools

 
Essex
Lists of buildings and structures in Essex